Christoph Haas (born 23 June 1992) is an Austrian professional footballer who plays as a goalkeeper for Admira Wacker.

Career
Haas is a product of the youth academies of SV Gerasdorf/Stammersdorf, Stadlau, and Waidhofen/Ybbs. In 2010, he began his senior career with Waidhofen/Ybbs and followed that up with a move to Vorwärts Steyr. He had stints at Amstetten and Ober-Grafendorf before joining the reserves of Rapid Wien. He occasionally acted as the third goalkeeper for Rapid Wien's main squad.

In 2019, Haas had a stint at Horn in the 2. Liga on 22 February 2019 where he made his professional debut. He moved to Admira Wacker on 4 July 2019 where he again acted as backup goalkeeper. He transferred to the Austrian Football Bundesliga club Ried on 14 June 2021 where he made 2 appearances. He returned to Admira Wacker on 21 June 2022, signing a contract until June 2024.

Personal life
Haas married presenter Kimberly Budinsky in June 2022.

References

External links
 
 OEFB Profile

1992 births
Living people
Footballers from Vienna
Austrian footballers
FC Waidhofen/Ybbs players
SK Vorwärts Steyr players
SKU Amstetten players
SK Rapid Wien players
SV Horn players
FC Admira Wacker Mödling players
SV Ried players
Austrian Football Bundesliga players
2. Liga (Austria) players
Austrian Regionalliga players
Association football goalkeepers